Center High School is a high school in Antelope, California, United States. The school opened up in its current location in 1984. It is one of two high schools in the Center Unified School District. The school's colors are blue and gold, and the school mascot is the cougar. The head of the school is Jerald Ferguson and there are two vice-principals. The school is well known for its diversity of many ethnic groups and is an accepting environment.

History
Center High School was under construction for years until it opened in 1982, but moved next door during the summer of 1984.

Teacher dismissal case
In 1999, Dana Rivers, a teacher at Center High School, was dismissed by the school board for coming out as a transgender female to students at the school.  This was despite being recognized as the "school’s most inspiring teacher" in 1993.
After the 3-2 decision by the board, Rivers filed a lawsuit for wrongful dismissal, ultimately securing a $150,000 settlement.  Rivers become known nationally as an advocate for transgender rights.

Campus
Center High School consists of various buildings in which classes are held. There are three buildings in the front of the school with the gym and locker rooms in one, the multipurpose room in another, and the administration. 

The school also hosts a variety of sports facilities as well. The school's football, soccer and track & field stadium was completed in 2009. Basketball and volleyball are played in the main gym, while wrestling takes place in the auxiliary Ken Thomas Gym. There are 6 tennis courts for the tennis team and two each of baseball and softball fields. The swim team uses the pool at nearby Rio Linda High School, while the golf teams use neighboring Cherry Island Golf Course.

Media Communications Academy
The school's Media Communications Academy (MCA), which is defined as "a school within a school", is dedicated to new media, video and audio production, and digital graphics. The program is available to students in their sophomore, junior and senior years. Students are enrolled in classes together as a group for English, Social Studies, Spanish, and Media classes.

The MCA is based on a program developed by CHS teacher Dana Rivers, who won an $80,000 award to develop the program designed to help unmotivated students.

Media
Blue & Gold is a school newspaper that covers topics dealing with events and going-ons within the High School as well as in popular entertainment. Blue & Gold was awarded with multiple Gold Crowns from the Columbia Scholastic Press Association in the years 1999, 2001, 2003, 2004, 2005, and 2006 and a silver crown in the 2007-2008 year.

Center High School's "Epic" yearbook has received seven National Pacemaker Awards.  It has also won multiple awards from the Columbia Scholastic Press Association including multiple gold and silver crowns.

Alumni

 Rich Manning- Retired NBA basketball player who last played for the Los Angeles Clippers.
 Fenuki Tupou- NFL guard, drafted in 2009 by the Philadelphia Eagles as a 5th round pick. Currently a practice squad member on the New Orleans Saints.
Nathan Lukes Toronto Blue Jays outfielder

References

High schools in Sacramento County, California
Educational institutions established in 1982
Public high schools in California
1982 establishments in California